Treesmill is a hamlet in Cornwall, England, United Kingdom. It is approximately one mile east of St Blazey.

References

Hamlets in Cornwall